Admiral Sir Walter Henry Cowan, 1st Baronet,  (11 June 1871 – 14 February 1956), known as Tich Cowan, was a Royal Navy officer who saw service in both the First and Second World Wars; in the latter he was one of the oldest British servicemen on active duty.

Early life
Cowan was born in Crickhowell, in Brecknockshire, Wales, on 11 June 1871, the eldest son of Walter Frederick James Cowan, an officer in the Royal Welch Fusiliers. After his father's retirement from the British Army, the family settled in Alveston, Warwickshire, where his father became a justice of the peace.

Cowan never went to school, but entered the Royal Navy in 1884 at the training ship, HMS Britannia, a classmate to fellow future admiral David Beatty.

Early service career
In 1886, as midshipmen, Cowan and Beatty joined , flagship of the Mediterranean Fleet. Cowan saw service in Benin and Nigeria in 1887. He fell sick and was invalided home after less than a year, but later rejoined Alexandra, returning with her to Britain in 1889. He then joined  in the Training Squadron and was commissioned as a sub-lieutenant in 1890. In 1892 he was promoted lieutenant and became first lieutenant of the gunboat . However, in 1893 he was invalided home with dysentery.

During this time he participated in a number of expeditions against native and Arab insurgents. In 1898, he was appointed to the destroyer  in the Mediterranean, but only stayed in her for six months before being given command of the Nile gunboat . He saw action in the Mahdist War, taking part in the Battle of Atbara and the Battle of Omdurman. He then commanded the entire Nile gunboat flotilla during the Fashoda Incident. He received the Distinguished Service Order for these actions.

Cowan then participated in the Second Boer War, acting as aide-de-camp to Lord Kitchener and then to Lord Roberts. Returning to England in 1901, Cowan was appointed first lieutenant of the battleship . In June 1901 he was promoted commander at the early age of thirty, and in May the following year he was appointed to the battleship , coast guard ship at Holyhead. He later took command of the destroyer  and acted as second-in-command of the Devonport destroyer flotilla under Roger Keyes, who was then developing new destroyer tactics. They became firm friends. Cowan commanded several more destroyers, acquiring a widespread reputation as a destroyer captain, and then succeeded Keyes in command of the flotilla. In 1904 he was appointed Member of the Royal Victorian Order. He transferred to the cruiser  in 1907. In 1908, he took command of all destroyers of the Channel Fleet. In 1909, he transferred to the Third Division of the Home Fleet with command of the nucleus-crewed , and in 1910 he became captain of the new light cruiser . In 1912, Cowan became Assistant to John de Robeck, who was then Admiral of Patrols.

First World War
In 1914, shortly before the outbreak of the First World War, Cowan was given command of the old pre-dreadnought . Six months later he took over the 26,270 ton , as flag captain to Osmond Brock. He commanded her at the Battle of Jutland, where she was badly damaged. He was appointed a Companion of the Order of the Bath in 1916.

In June 1917 Cowan was made commodore of the 1st Light Cruiser Squadron, which he led at the Second Battle of Heligoland Bight on 17 November 1917. In 1918 he was promoted rear admiral, staying in command of the squadron.

The Baltic
In January 1919 the 1st Light Cruiser Squadron was sent to the Baltic Sea. Cowan's mission was to keep the sea lanes open to the new republics of Finland, Latvia, Estonia and Lithuania, which were under threat of being overrun by Soviet Russia. The squadron support enabled them to secure their freedom. During the course of this campaign, coastal motor boats attached to Cowan's command sank one Bolshevik battleship and a cruiser at Kronstadt naval base. Augustus Agar received the Victoria Cross for his part in these events. Andrew Browne Cunningham, later Britain's leading Second World War admiral, commanded Cowan's destroyers in this campaign. Cowan's forceful diplomacy ensured a successful mission, for which he was advanced to Knight Commander of the Order of the Bath in 1919 and created a baronet, "of the Baltic", in the 1921 New Year Honours. He was awarded the Cross of Liberty (VR I/1) of Estonia.

Between the wars
He was unemployed from 1923 to 1925, although he was promoted vice admiral in 1923. In 1925 he was appointed Commander-in-Chief, Coast of Scotland and, in 1926, Commander-in-Chief, America and West Indies Station, holding the command until 1928. He was promoted admiral in 1927. His final appointment was as First and Principal Naval Aide-de-Camp to the King in 1930. He retired in 1931.

Second World War
During the Second World War, Cowan was given a job by his old friend Roger Keyes, then head of the Commandos. Cowan voluntarily took the lower rank of commander and went to Scotland in 1941 to train the newly formed corps in small boat handling. He managed to get himself sent to the North African theatre of operations with the Commandos. Shortly after arrival he saw action at the second Battle of Mechili in April 1941.

In May 1941, in his 72nd year, Cowan took part in two abortive seaborne raids with No. 8 (Guards) Commando involving an expedition along the North Egyptian and Cyrenaica coast aboard , a river gun-boat from the China Station with a top speed of 12 knots. The expeditions were repeatedly attacked from the air over several days by Axis forces before being constrained to abandon the endeavour on the second attempt through battle damage to the boat's rudder mechanism, which limited it to going around in circles in repetition. During the incessant attacks, with scores of bombs splashing into the sea about the vessel, Cowan (believed by the commandos in whose midst he was, to be seeking a heroic death in action) was regularly to be seen on the deck blazing away at the oncoming hostile aircraft with a Tommy Gun.

Cowan also saw action subsequently at the Battle of Bir Hakeim, where, having attached himself to the Indian 18th King Edward VII's Own Cavalry, he was captured on 27 May 1942, having fought an Italian tank crew single-handedly armed only with a revolver. He was repatriated in 1943 under an agreement with Italy whereby some 800 Italian seamen interned in neutral Saudi Arabia from the Red Sea Flotilla were exchanged for a similar number of British prisoners of war. An unusual feature was that there was no stipulation about the men's future activities and they were free to return to action. Accordingly, Cowan rejoined the commandos and saw action again in Italy during 1944. He was awarded a Bar to his Distinguished Service Order for "gallantry, determination and undaunted devotion to duty as Liaison Officer with Commandos in the attack and capture of Mount Ornito, Italy and during attacks on the islands of Solta, Mljet and Brac in the Adriatic, all of which operations were carried out under very heavy fire from the enemy".

Cowan retired once more in 1945. After the war he was invited to become the honorary colonel of the 18th King Edward's Own Cavalry, and visited India to receive the post, which he considered the greatest he had attained in his extensive military career.

Death and tribute

Cowan died on 14 February 1956, in his 85th year. The Cowan Baronetcy became extinct on his death.

The ship's crest is based on Cowan's family arms. Memorials in the Estonian capital Tallinn, in the Latvian capital Riga and in Portsmouth Cathedral commemorate the 110 men of the Royal Navy and Royal Air Force killed in the Baltic action of 1919.

Footnotes

Further reading
Cowan's War, The British Naval Action in the Baltic in 1919 by Geoffrey Bennett (1964). Republished in 2002 as Freeing the Baltic. 
Sound of the guns, being an account of the wars and service of Admiral Sir Walter Cowan by Lionel George Dawson, (Pen-in-hand, Oxford, 1949)

External links

HMS Hood Association biography

|-

|-

|-

1871 births
1956 deaths
People from Crickhowell
People from Stratford-on-Avon District
Royal Navy personnel of the Mahdist War
Royal Navy personnel of the Second Boer War
Royal Navy officers of World War I
Royal Navy officers of World War II
Royal Navy admirals
Companions of the Distinguished Service Order
Allied intervention in the Russian Civil War
Baronets in the Baronetage of the United Kingdom
Knights Commander of the Order of the Bath
Members of the Royal Victorian Order
Royal Navy personnel of the Russian Civil War
British military personnel of the Benin Expedition of 1897